Ghislain Albert Hector Delaunois (20 December 1923 – 12 December 1992) was a Belgian fencer. He competed at the 1952 and 1956 Summer Olympics.

References

1923 births
1992 deaths
Belgian male fencers
Belgian épée fencers
Belgian foil fencers
Olympic fencers of Belgium
Fencers at the 1952 Summer Olympics
Fencers at the 1956 Summer Olympics